Christi Jacobsen is an American politician from the state of Montana. A Republican, she is the Secretary of State of Montana.

Early life 
Jacobsen was born in Helena, Montana, and earned her bachelor's degree from Carroll College in 1997 and a Master of Public Administration from the University of Montana in 2000.

Career 
She served as an administrator for the Montana State Auditor's office and the Montana Department of Justice. 

In 2016, incoming Secretary of State of Montana Corey Stapleton announced that Jacobsen would serve as his chief of staff.

Montana Secretary of State 
With Stapleton not running for reelection as Secretary of State of Montana in the 2020 elections, Jacobsen announced her candidacy. In the Republican Party primary election, she defeated fellow Republicans Forrest Mandeville, Scott Sales, and Brad Johnson. She defeated Bryce Bennett, the Democratic Party nominee, in the general election. 

Jacobsen was sworn into office on January 4, 2021. Shortly thereafter, she expressed her support for Republican legislation to end same-day voter registration in Montana for all except military and overseas voters. In April 2021, Governor Greg Gianforte signed into law these restrictions; among the new restrictions was the end of same-day voter registration in Montana, as well prevention of university students from using a student ID as a voter ID to vote. The new restrictions also limited ballot collection, which complicated voting in communities where election infrastructure was limited, such as the Native American community in Montana, a Democratic-leaning constituency.

Personal life 
Jacobsen and her husband, Eric, have five children.

References

External links

 Christi Jacobsen official website

1970s births
Living people
21st-century American politicians
21st-century American women politicians
Carroll College (Montana) alumni
Montana Republicans
Politicians from Helena, Montana
Secretaries of State of Montana
University of Montana alumni
Year of birth missing (living people)